The Kent–Valentine House is a historic home in Richmond, Virginia.  It was built in 1845 from plans by Isaiah Rogers of Boston. It is a three-story, five bay, stuccoed brick mansion with a
two-story wing at the rear of the west side. It features a two-story, three-bay portico with Roman Ionic columns and balustrade. In 1904, the house was enlarged to its present five bay width and the interior redesigned in the Colonial Revival style.

It was listed on the National Register of Historic Places in 1970.

The house is the headquarters of the Historic Garden Week project of the Garden Club of Virginia, which is the nation's only statewide house and garden tour that runs for a week each April across the state of Virginia. In its 84th year, the tour is of Virginia's most historic houses, as well as a sampling of other notable private residences. It is run from offices at the Kent–Valentine House on Franklin Street in downtown Richmond, Virginia.

References

External links
Horace Kent House, First & Franklin Streets, Richmond, Independent City, VA: 1 photo at Historic American Buildings Survey

Houses on the National Register of Historic Places in Virginia
Colonial Revival architecture in Virginia
Houses completed in 1845
National Register of Historic Places in Richmond, Virginia
Houses in Richmond, Virginia